Created in 1956, Samuel Ayer High School was the first high school in the City of Milpitas, California.  It was located at 1395 E. Calaveras Blvd.  Previous to its opening, Milpitas high school students attended James Lick High School in San Jose.  With the opening of Milpitas High School in 1969, the two schools coexisted until 1980 when declining enrollment caused Samuel Ayer to be closed.

The campus has now been put to use as the Milpitas Sports Center, Teen Center and Adult Education Center.

See also
List of closed secondary schools in California

Defunct schools in California
Educational institutions disestablished in 1980
1956 establishments in California